Kivi (also Romanized as Kīvī; also known as Kīvī Zāvīyeh) is a village in Khvoresh Rostam-e Shomali Rural District, Khvoresh Rostam District, Khalkhal County, Ardabil Province, Iran. At the 2006 census, its population was 190, in 54 families.

Name 
According to Vladimir Minorsky, the name "Kivi" is derived from the historical Tatar tribe called Kūyīn or Kü'īn.

References 

Towns and villages in Khalkhal County